WPLA (1380 AM) was a radio station licensed to Portsmouth, New Hampshire, United States. The station, which was established in 1960 as WBBX and operated until 2015, served the Portsmouth area. The station was owned by iHeartMedia.

History

The station went on the air as WBBX on December 5, 1960. The station changed its call letters to WAVI on May 17, 1985, to WQMI on July 24, 1987, to WCQL on March 13, 1989, to WTMN on February 19, 1995, to WMYF on December 1, 1998, to WMGE on September 16, 2016, and to the current WPLA on December 14, 2016.

On November 22, 2010, WMYF changed their format from adult standards to sports, branded as "The Sports Animal". As of October 1, 2013, the station reverted to the standards format. On February 1, 2014, WMYF shifted to classic country.

WMYF carried Portland Sea Dogs baseball games, and Portsmouth High School Basketball Boys and Girls home games.

WMYF went silent on December 9, 2015 after losing its transmitter site. The station's programming continues to be available online at their website, and is also broadcast over-the-air as an HD2 sub-channel of WTBU on HD Radio receivers. The call letters were changed to WMGE on September 16, 2016 and to WPLA on December 14, 2016.

On May 17, 2017, the FCC informed WPLA that it was in the process of cancelling the station's license for not returning to the air within a year of going silent; the license was canceled on June 29, 2017.

References

External links
FCC Station Search Details: DWPLA (Facility ID: 35217)
 (covering 1958-1980 as WBBX)

PLA (AM)
Radio stations established in 1960
1960 establishments in New Hampshire
Radio stations disestablished in 2015
2015 disestablishments in New Hampshire
Portsmouth, New Hampshire
IHeartMedia radio stations
Defunct radio stations in the United States
PLA